See also 1998 in birding and ornithology, main events of 1999 and 2000 in birding and ornithology

Worldwide

New species

See also Bird species new to science described in the 1990s

 The jocotoco antpitta from Ecuador is described.

Taxonomic developments
To be completed

Europe

Britain

Breeding birds
More than 400 red kites fledged across Britain.

Migrant and wintering birds
 Large numbers of pomarine skuas are seen off the east coast during October and November.

Rare birds
 The third and fourth Iberian chiffchaffs are seen during the spring.
 Britain's third spectacled warbler is seen in Devon in June.
 The first royal tern for Scotland and fifth for Britain is seen in Lothian in August.
 There is an influx of American waders during September.
 A short-billed dowitcher seen first in Aberdeenshire and then in Cleveland is the first record for Britain.
 Britain's first short-toed eagle (Circaetus gallicus) is found on the Isles of Scilly on 7 October until 11 October
 A black-faced bunting in Northumberland in October is the second for Britain.
 Britain's second mourning dove appears in the Outer Hebrides in November.
 Britain's fifth Balearic woodchat shrike (Lanius senator badius) at Troy Town, St Agnes from 21 to 27 April. (Accepted by the BBRC)

Other events
 The British Birdwatching Fair has Brazil's Atlantic forests as its theme for the year.

Scandinavia
To be completed

North America
 In April, Louisiana State University student David Kulivan sees a pair of ivory-billed woodpeckers in the Pearl River Wildlife Management Area on the Louisiana/Mississippi border.

To be completed

Asia
To be completed

References

Birding and ornithology
Birding and ornithology by year
Ornithology